Fragging is the deliberate or attempted killing of a soldier, usually a superior, by a fellow soldier. U.S. military personnel coined the word during the Vietnam War, when such killings were most often committed or attempted with a fragmentation grenade, to make it appear that the killing was accidental or during combat with the enemy. The term fragging now encompasses any deliberate killing of military colleagues.

The high number of fragging incidents in the latter years of the Vietnam War was symptomatic of the unpopularity of the war with the American public and the breakdown of discipline in the U.S. Armed Forces. Documented and suspected fragging incidents using explosives totaled 904 from 1969 to 1972, while hundreds of fragging incidents using firearms took place, but were hard to quantify as they were indistinguishable from combat deaths and poorly documented.

Fragging should not be confused with the unintentional killing and/or wounding of comrades and/or allied personnel; such incidents are referred to as friendly fire. Many friendly fire incidents were suspected to be deliberate.

Motivation
Soldiers have killed colleagues since the beginning of armed conflict, with many documented instances throughout history. However, the practice of fragging seems to have been relatively uncommon in the U.S. military until the Vietnam War. The prevalence of fragging was partially based on the ready availability of explosive weapons such as fragmentation hand grenades. Grenades were untraceable to an owner and did not leave any ballistic evidence. M18 Claymore mines and other explosives were also occasionally used in fragging, as were firearms, although the term, as defined by the military during the Vietnam War, applied only to the use of explosives to kill fellow soldiers. Most fragging incidents were in the Army and Marine Corps. Fragging was rare among Navy and Air Force personnel, who had less access to grenades and weapons than did soldiers and Marines.

The first known incidents of fragging in South Vietnam took place in 1966, but events in 1968 appear to have catalyzed an increase in fragging. After the Tet Offensive in January and February 1968, the Vietnam War became increasingly unpopular in the United States and among American soldiers in Vietnam, many of them conscripts. Secondly, racial tensions between white and black soldiers and marines increased after the assassination of Martin Luther King Jr. in April 1968. With troops reluctant to risk their lives in what was perceived as a lost war, fragging was seen by some enlisted men "as the most effective way to discourage their superiors from showing enthusiasm for combat."

Morale plummeted among soldiers and marines. In 1971, a USMC colonel declared in the Armed Forces Journal that "The morale, discipline, and battle worthiness of the U.S. Armed Forces are, with a few salient exceptions, lower and worse than at any time in this century and possibly in the history of the United States."

The U.S. military reflected social problems and issues in the U.S. such as racism, drug abuse, and resentment toward authoritarian leaders. As the U.S. began to withdraw its military forces from Vietnam, some American enlisted men and young officers lost their sense of purpose for being in Vietnam, and the hierarchical relationship between enlisted men and their officers deteriorated. The resentment directed from enlisted men toward older officers was exacerbated by generational gaps, as well as different perceptions of how the military should conduct itself. Enforcement of military regulations, especially if done overzealously, led to complaints and sometimes threats of physical violence directed toward officers.

A number of factors may have influenced the incidence of fragging. The demand for manpower for the war in Vietnam caused the armed forces to lower their standards for inducting both officers and enlisted men. The rapid rotation of personnel, especially of officers who served (on average) less than six months in command roles, decreased the stability and cohesion of military units.  Most important of all, perhaps, was the loss of purpose in fighting the war, as it became apparent to all that the United States was withdrawing from the war without having achieved any sort of victory. Morale and discipline deteriorated.

Most fragging was perpetrated by enlisted men against officers. Enlisted men, in the words of one company commander, "...feared they would get stuck with a lieutenant or platoon sergeant who would want to carry out all kinds of crazy John Wayne tactics, who would use their lives in an effort to win the war single-handedly, win the big medal, and get his picture in the hometown paper." Harassment of subordinates by a superior was another frequent motive. The stereotypical fragging incident was of "an aggressive career officer being assaulted by disillusioned subordinates." Several fragging incidents resulted from alleged racism between black and white soldiers. Attempts by officers to control drug use caused others. Most known fragging incidents were carried out by soldiers in support units rather than soldiers in combat units.

Soldiers sometimes used non-lethal smoke and tear-gas grenades to warn superiors that they were in more serious danger if they did not change their behavior. A few instances occurred—and many more were rumored—in which enlisted men pooled their money for "bounties" on particular officers or non-commissioned officers to reward soldiers for fragging them.

U.S. Forces in Vietnam

According to author George Lepre, the total number of known and suspected fragging cases using explosives in Vietnam from 1969 to 1972 totalled nearly 900, with 99 deaths and many injuries. This total is incomplete, as some cases were not reported, nor were statistics kept before 1969 (although several incidents from 1966 to 1968 are known). Most of the victims or intended victims were officers or non-commissioned officers. The number of fraggings increased in 1970 and 1971 even though the U.S. military was withdrawing and the number of U.S. military personnel in Vietnam was declining.

An earlier calculation by authors Richard A. Gabriel and Paul L. Savage, estimated that up to 1,017 fragging incidents may have taken place in Vietnam, causing 86 deaths and 714 injuries of U.S. military personnel, the majority officers and NCOs.

By the end of the war at least 450 officers were killed in fraggings using fragmentation grenades, while more undocumented instances were suspected.

Fragging statistics include only incidents involving explosives, most commonly grenades. Several hundred murders of U.S. soldiers by firearms occurred in Vietnam but most were of enlisted men killing other enlisted men of nearly equal rank. Fewer than ten officers are known to have been murdered by firearms. However, rumors and claims abound of the deliberate killing of officers and non-commissioned officers by enlisted men under battlefield conditions. The frequency and number of these fraggings, indistinguishable from combat deaths, cannot be quantified.

Response
The U.S. military's responses to fragging incidents included greater restrictions on access to weapons, especially grenades, for soldiers in non-combat units and post-fragging "lockdowns" in which a whole unit was isolated until after an investigation. For example, in May 1971, the U.S. Army in Vietnam temporarily halted the issuance of grenades to nearly all units and soldiers in Vietnam, inventoried stocks of weapons, and searched soldiers' quarters, confiscating weapons, ammunition, grenades, and knives. This, however, failed to reduce fragging incidents as soldiers could easily obtain weapons in a flourishing black market among nearby Vietnamese communities. The U.S. military also attempted to diminish adverse publicity concerning fragging and the security measures it was taking to reduce it.

Only a few fraggers were identified and prosecuted. It was often difficult to distinguish between fragging and enemy action.  A grenade thrown into a foxhole or tent could be a fragging, or the action of an enemy infiltrator or saboteur. Enlisted men were often close-mouthed in fragging investigations, refusing to inform on their colleagues out of fear or solidarity. Sentences for fragging convictions were severe—but the few men convicted often served fairly brief prison sentences. Ten fraggers were convicted of murder and served sentences from ten months to forty years with a mean (average) prison time of about nine years.

Influence
In the Vietnam War, the threat of fragging caused many officers and NCOs to go armed in rear areas and to change their sleeping arrangements as fragging often consisted of throwing a grenade into a tent where the target was sleeping. For fear of being fragged, some leaders turned a blind eye to drug use and other indiscipline among the men in their charge. Fragging, the threat of fragging, and investigations of fragging sometimes disrupted or delayed tactical combat operations. Officers were sometimes forced to negotiate with their enlisted men to obtain their consent before undertaking dangerous patrols.

The breakdown of discipline, including fragging, was an important influence on the U.S. change to an all-volunteer military in place of conscription. The last conscript was inducted into the army in 1973. The volunteer military moderated some of the coercive methods of discipline previously used to maintain order in military ranks.

Coalition forces in Afghanistan

During the war in Afghanistan (2001–2021) hundreds of coalition soldiers were intentionally killed by Islamic Republic of Afghanistan forces. Increases in insider attacks against coalition forces were noted after high-profile provocations such as the 2012 Afghanistan Quran burning protests and the Kandahar massacre. 

In 2012, according to NATO, 51 coalition service members died due to the deliberate actions from members of the Afghan forces. Another 65 NATO soldiers were killed in insider attacks between 2007 and 2011. The increase in so called "green-on-blue attacks" prompted U.S. officials to revamp the screening process of potential Afghan recruits as Afghan military leadership identified "hundreds" of Afghan soldiers within their ranks who were linked to the Taliban insurgency or harbored anti-American views.

Most of the attackers in these incidents were members of the special Afghan Local Police (ALP) units, who operated as a local tribal force and were known to have ties to the Taliban. They were are also known to use drugs and were sometimes reported for abusing civilians.

The Long War Journal reported on such attacks, counting 155 since 2008 to 11 June 2017, resulting in 152 Coalition dead and 193 wounded. ANA fighters sometimes fled to the Taliban, which posted videos 'welcoming' the fleeing fighters. NATO commanders initially stated that an estimated 90% of the attacks are due to cultural differences and personal enmity while the Afghan government disagreed with NATO’s analyst and blamed the problem on “infiltration by foreign spy agencies”, including those of “neighboring countries”.

To reduce insider attacks coalition soldiers were reminded to be respectful.

Notable incidents 
 1704: Battle of Blenheim: An unpopular major of the 15th Regiment of Foot was shot in the head by his own men after the battle had been won.  
 1718: Charles XII of Sweden was shot and killed during the siege of Halden; the shot was possibly fired by one of his own soldiers. 
 1777: Battle of Saratoga: Lieutenant Colonel Heinrich von Breymann, the ranking officer of German forces as well as their Native American allies in service of the British during the defeats at the Battle of Bennington and the Battle of Saratoga, was so disgusted with the performance of his men that he began attacking them with his sabre; one of the men promptly pulled out a pistol and shot von Breymann dead.
 1815: Battle of Quatre Bras: The commander of the 92nd (Gordon Highlanders) Regiment of Foot, Colonel John Cameron of Fassfern, was shot and killed by a man whom he had recently flogged.
 1847: Mexican–American War: On two occasions,  Lieutenant Colonel Braxton Bragg (later a Confederate general) survived an attempt on his life when an artillery shell exploded under his bed.
 1894: Battle of the Yalu River: Admiral Ding Ruchang's legs were crushed, either due to a construction defect or the deliberate misfiring of his ship's main battery by the ship's captain.
 July 6, 1999: U.S infantry soldier Barry Winchell was murdered with a baseball bat while he slept outside of his barracks by Calvin Glover for dating a transgender woman.
 November 5, 2009: U.S. Army major and psychiatrist Nidal Hasan went on a shooting spree at Fort Hood that led to the deaths of 13 fellow soldiers and 32 being injured, before being shot and paralyzed from the waist down. On August 23, 2013, he was convicted of 13 counts of premeditated murder and 32 counts of attempted premeditated murder, and was sentenced to death on August 28, 2013.
 September 16, 2013: U.S. Navy petty officer Aaron Alexis went on a shooting spree at a Navy yard using a Remington Model 870 shotgun and a Beretta M9 pistol; he killed 12 people and injured 8 more before being killed by a shot to the head from responding police officers.
 November 4, 2016: A Jordanian soldier stationed at the King Faisal Air Base in Jordan gunned down American soldiers attempting to enter a checkpoint, the shootout lead to the deaths of 3 American soldiers and ended when an American soldier shot and critically wounded the Jordanian. The Jordanian was sentenced to life in prison.

World War I
 According to General Frank Percy Crozier, an unpopular British Army sergeant was murdered when one of his men came up behind him and dropped an unpinned hand grenade down his trousers.

Vietnam War (U.S. forces)
 1969: After the controversial U.S casualties during the Battle of Hamburger Hill, the G.I underground newspaper “G.I says” in Vietnam placed a $10,000 bounty on Colonel Weldon Honeycutt, leading to multiple unsuccessful fragging attempts against him.
 April 21, 1969: A grenade was thrown into the company office of K Company, 9th Marines, at Quảng Trị Combat Base, RVN, with First Lieutenant Robert T. Rohweller dying of wounds he received in the explosion. Private Reginald F. Smith, who was apprehended after boasting about the killing to a colleague in formation while still having a grenade ring on his finger, pleaded guilty to the premeditated murder of Rohweller and was sentenced to 40 years' imprisonment; he was murdered by a fellow inmate in prison on 25 July 1982.
 March 15, 1971: A grenade was tossed into an officer billet at Bien Hoa Army Airfield, with Lieutenants Thomas A. Dellwo and Richard E. Harlan of the 1st Cavalry Division (Airmobile) being killed. Private Billy Dean Smith was charged with the murders of the officers but was acquitted at a court-martial in November 1972.

Vietnam War (Australian forces)
 November 23, 1969: Lieutenant Robert Thomas Convery of the 9th Battalion of the Royal Australian Regiment was killed when a grenade exploded as he was asleep in his tent at Nui Dat, South Vietnam, following a night of heavy drinking within the Battalion. Private Peter Denzil Allen was convicted of Convery's murder and served ten years and eight months of a life sentence in Risdon Prison.
 December 25, 1970: Private Paul Raymond (Ramon) Ferriday took his SLR rifle and opened fire into the Sergeant's Mess of the Royal Australian Army Service Corps at Nui Dat, South Vietnam, following an all-day drinking session: Sergeants Allan Brian Moss and Wallace James Galvin were shot dead and Sergeant Frederick Edwin Bowtell wounded. During his court-martial, an Army psychiatrist described Ferriday as having a "paranoid character" and being prone to fits of rage, despite witnesses describing him as being aware of his actions and giving details of previous threatening altercations.  Ferriday was convicted on two counts of manslaughter and one of assault with a weapon, and served eight years of a ten-year sentence.

Middle East peacekeeping
 October 27, 1982: Irish Army Private Michael McAleavey, serving at Tebnine with the United Nations Interim Force in Lebanon, dropped into a combat stance at a checkpoint before opening fire with his FN FAL battle rifle: Corporal Gregory Morrow as well as Privates Thomas Murphy and Peter Burke were all shot dead. Pvt. McAleavey told Irish Military Police investigators they had been killed by Lebanese gunmen, but ultimately confessed, claiming that he had "snapped" due to dehydration and heat exhaustion. McAleavey was convicted of all three murders at a court-martial and was sentenced to life imprisonment, only being paroled in 2010.

The Troubles 
 May 9, 1992: During the reconstruction of a Royal Ulster Constabulary (RUC) security base devastated just two days before by a Provisional IRA tractor bomb at Fivemiletown, in County Tyrone, while soldiers from the First Battalion Staffordshire Regiment were providing a security detail to the workers, an eighteen-year-old private fired his SA80 rifle 14 times at the company's sergeant major in a frenzy, killing him in front of the rest of the platoon. The serviceman was eventually acquitted of the charge of murder in 1993, but declared guilty of manslaughter. There were allegations of previous hazing and bullying by the non-commissioned officer against his subordinate.

War in Afghanistan

 August 17, 2002: Following an altercation, Corporal John Gregory shot and killed British Army Sergeant Robert Busuttil of the Royal Logistic Corps as he lay in a hammock during a barbecue at Kabul International Airport. Corporal Gregory, who was drunk and under the influence of medication, then killed himself. Wiltshire coroner David Masters asked the British Army "to tighten its rules on alcohol and gun security."
 January 20, 2012: An Afghan soldier shot dead four French soldiers and wounded 15, 8 of the wounded were in serious condition. He was arrested and confessed his motivation came from a published video of American Marines urinating on dead Taliban fighters and a published video of British soldiers abusing a Afghan boy and girl. The incident lead to French president Nicolas Sarkozy threatening to suspend French operations in Afghanistan.
 August 5, 2014: During a high-ranking coalition delegation speech at the Marshal Fahim National Defense University an Afghan soldier opened fire on a crowd of 90 coalition officials and soldiers leading to the death of U.S. Major General Harold J. Greene and wounding of 14 others including a German general. The Afghan soldier was killed by a Danish and an American soldier.

Iraq War (U.S. forces)
 March 23, 2003: In Kuwait, Sergeant Hasan Karim Akbar cut power to his base and threw four hand grenades into three tents where fellow members of the 101st Airborne Division were sleeping, before opening fire with his rifle as the personnel ran to take cover. Army Captain Christopher S. Seifert and Air Force Major Gregory L. Stone were killed and fourteen other soldiers wounded. Akbar was convicted at a court-martial at Fort Bragg, North Carolina on April 21, 2005 on two counts of premeditated murder and three counts of attempted premeditated murder, and was sentenced to death on April 28.
 June 7, 2005: Captain Phillip Esposito and 1st Lieutenant Louis Allen were both killed after a Claymore mine placed on Esposito's office window was detonated at Forward Operating Base Danger in Tikrit, Iraq. The unit's supply sergeant was charged with the murders, but was acquitted at court martial.
 July 19, 2005: The Death of LaVena Johnson is a suspected fragging incident: she was found dead with a broken nose, black eye, loose teeth, gunshot wound to the mouth, and burns from a corrosive chemical on her genitals. Additionally, bloody footprints were discovered outside of her living quarters. The U.S Army ruled her death as a suicide, and denied claims by her father that she was raped and murdered. Christopher Grey, chief of public affairs for the USACIDC, accused people of spreading misinformation on the internet that she was murdered.
 2008: Army sergeant Joseph Bozicevich killed two fellow soldiers: one of his victims was found shot seven times in the corner of the base's small communications station and another fell in the dirt outside with six bullets in his back. Several witnesses said they saw Bozicevich chasing one of them while firing at him and fired two shots while he stood directly over him. Witnesses also testified to hearing Bozicevich screaming "Kill me!" as he was pinned to the ground. In 2011 he was sentenced to life in prison.
 May 11, 2009: Sergeant John Russell opened fire on Camp Liberty with an M16A2 rifle and shot dead five U.S. military personnel. Russell pleaded guilty to five counts of premeditated murder and was sentenced to life in prison without the possibility of parole.
 September 7, 2010: A Iraqi soldier pulled out his weapon and opened fire on a group of U.S soldiers after getting into a argument with one of them, leading to two deaths and nine injuries. The Iraqi was shot and killed.
 September 23, 2010: United States Army Spc. Neftaly Platero shot dead two of his roommates and injured another who he had arguments with in Fallujah. In June 2013 he was sentenced to life in prison without the possibility of parole.
 June 12, 2011: An Iraqi soldier killed two U.S soldiers and wounded a third after smuggling real bullets into a U.S base training centre. He was quickly killed by U.S soldiers managing the training event.

Royal Navy 
 April 28, 2011: During a port visit to Southampton, Able Seaman Ryan Donovan abandoned his sentry post at the boarding ramp of the submarine HMS Astute, and entered the submarine's weapons locker. Donovan took an SA80 rifle  and opened fire on CPOs David McCoy and Chris Brown after they confronted him. Donovan then forced his way into the control room, where he shot dead Lieutenant Commander Ian Molyneux and wounded Lt Cdr Christopher Hodge before being tackled to the ground by a visiting dignitary, city council leader Royston Smith, as he reloaded. Donovan pleaded guilty to Molyneux's murder and the attempted murders of Hodge, Brown, and McCoy, and was sentenced to life imprisonment with a minimum of 25 years.

Ukrainian National Guard 
 January 27, 2022: A Ukrainian conscript soldier serving in Ukraine’s National Guard opened fire in a machine factory, killing five fellow soldiers and wounding five others, before fleeing the scene: he was later arrested by police.

2022 Russian invasion of Ukraine
 Unknown: According to a Facebook post by a Ukrainian journalist published on March 23, after suffering heavy losses (in excess of close to half of their brigade) a group of Russian conscripts of the 37th Motor Rifle Brigade reportedly attacked their commanding officer, Colonel Yuri Medvedev, running him over with a tank, crushing both his legs approximately 30 miles from Kyiv, during the battle of Makariv. An unnamed senior Western official said Medvedev later died of his injuries. The date of the incident is unknown but reports of the hospitalization of Medvedev appeared on March 11.

See also

 Fratricide
 List of friendly fire incidents
 Mutiny
 Naval Air Station Pensacola shooting
 United States v. Hasan K. Akbar

References

Military slang and jargon
War casualties
Improvised explosive device bombings
Killings by type
Deaths by explosive device
Vietnam War